The Polar Party was a nationalist and conservative political party in Greenland led by Nikolaj Heinrich.

History
The party won a single seat in the 1987 elections, which it retained in the 1991 elections. However, it received just 90 votes in the 1995 elections, losing its seat in Parliament.

References

Defunct political parties in Greenland
Greenlandic nationalism
National conservative parties